Daniel Gerard O'Neill (born 27 January 1973) is an Irish former hurler who played for Kilkenny Championship club Dicksboro and at inter-county level with the Kilkenny senior hurling team. He lined out in a number of positions but usually at midfield.

Career

O'Neill played hurling at club level at juvenile and underage levels with Dicksboro. He lined out in various schoolboy competitions with Kilkenny CBS before later winning a Fitzgibbon Cup college title with University College Dublin in 1993. O'Neill claimed his first title at adult level when Dicksboro won the Kilkenny IHC title in 1991 before later winning a Kilkenny SHC title in 1993. Later in his club career, he won an All-Ireland Intermediate Club Hurling Championship title in 2006.

At inter-county level, O'Neill first appeared as a member of the Kilkenny minor hurling team that won consecutive All-Ireland MHC titles in 1990 and 1991. He also won an All-Ireland U20HC with the under-21 team in 1994. O'Neill joined the Kilkenny senior hurling team in 1995. He was an unused substitute when Kilkenny were beaten by Offaly in the 1998 All-Ireland final.

Honours

University College Dublin
Fitzgibbon Cup: 1993

Dicksboro
Kilkenny Senior Hurling Championship: 1993
All-Ireland Intermediate Club Hurling Championship: 2005
Leinster Intermediate Club Hurling Championship: 2005
Kilkenny Intermediate Hurling Championship: 1991, 2005

Kilkenny
Leinster Senior Hurling Championship: 1998
All-Ireland Under-21 Hurling Championship: 1994
Leinster Under-21 Hurling Championship: 1993, 1994
All-Ireland Minor Hurling Championship: 1990, 1991
Leinster Minor Hurling Championship: 1990, 1991

References

1973 births
Living people
UCD hurlers
Dicksboro hurlers
Kilkenny inter-county hurlers
Hurling selectors